Joel Kipnis (known to most in the recording industry simply as JK) is a producer, writer, soul/R&B guitarist and owner of New York City recording studio, Pulse, Joel has written and produced records with Herbie Hancock, John Forte (Fugees producer), Soul II Soul, The Temptations, Jennifer Love Hewitt, Syleena Johnson, Pete Belasco and others. He has also produced and written TV commercials for Chevrolet, Kodak, Pepsi and Coca-Cola, among other recognized brands.

References

Living people
Year of birth missing (living people)